DYHY (97.5 FM), broadcasting as Barangay FM 97.5, is a radio station owned and operated by GMA Network Inc. Its studios and transmitter are located along Solid Road, Brgy. San Manuel, Puerto Princesa.

References

External links

Barangay FM stations
Radio stations in Puerto Princesa
Radio stations established in 1997